Year Zero is a Big Finish Productions audio drama featuring Lisa Bowerman as Bernice Summerfield, a character from the spin-off media based on the long-running British science fiction television series Doctor Who.

Plot 
Bernice is trapped on a planet where archeology is illegal. To return home she must break the law to find out what happened in Year Zero.

Cast
Bernice Summerfield - Lisa Bowerman
Gormune - Chris Porter
Pallis - Evie Dawnay
Matka - Maria McErlane

External links
Professor Bernice Summerfield: Year Zero 

Year Zero
Fiction set in the 27th century